Homefront is an American television drama series created and produced by Lynn Marie Latham and Bernard Lechowick in association with Lorimar Television for ABC. The show was set in the fictional city of River Run, Ohio in 1945, 1946, and 1947. The show's theme song, "Accentuate the Positive", was written by Johnny Mercer and performed by Jack Sheldon. Forty-two episodes were broadcast in the United States over two seasons from 1991 to 1993.

Series overview

Episodes

Season 1 (1991–92)

Season 2 (1992–93)

References

External links 
 
 

Lists of American drama television series episodes